The Rugby Canada National Junior Championship was an amateur rugby union competition in Canada. It only lasted two seasons, 2009 and 2010.  The 2009 champion was the Vancouver Wave, and the 2010 championship went to the Newfoundland Rock.

The league was created when Rugby Canada disbanded the Rugby Canada Super League (RCSL) and replace it with a new under-20 league. The league consisted of 12 teams, and was broken up into four divisions; Pacific, Prairie, Central, and Atlantic.

The league was intended to train, test, and get young rugby players ready so that someday they will be able to compete for the Canadian national rugby union team.

Teams

Western Conference

Eastern Conference

Finals

See also

Rugby Canada
Rugby Canada Super League
MacTier Cup

References

External links
Official website

Defunct rugby union leagues in Canada
2009 establishments in Canada
Sports leagues established in 2009
2009 in Canadian rugby union
2010 in Canadian rugby union